Titus Lewis (21 February 1773 – 1 May 1811) was a Welsh Baptist minister and author. Lewis is notable for several important works, including the publication of A Welsh-English Dictionary (1805) and several volumes of hymns and biblical commentaries.

Bibliography
Lewis was born in Cilgerran to Lewis Thomas, a minister at Cilfowyr. He was baptised at Blaen-y-waun and was preaching by 1794, and was  ordained there in 1798. He married in 1800, but his wife's dislike of the area saw them move to Carmarthen, where he became minister of Dark Gate Baptist Church. In 1805 he published A Welsh-English Dictionary, and in 1806 with the aid of Joseph Harris, he published the journal Y Drysorfa Efangylaidd, Lewis using the pseudonyms 'Obadiah' and 'Gaius' while Harris wrote under the name 'Adelphos o Abertawe'. In 1810 Lewis published  Hanes … Prydain Fawr, a 624-page volume and his most significant work. He then, along with Christmas Evans, and Harris, decided to translate Gill's commentary on the New Testament into Welsh. It is believed that the published work of this project was primarily Lewis', based on the evidence that after his death in 1811, no further translations appeared.

Notes

1773 births
1811 deaths
Welsh-language writers
Welsh writers
19th-century Welsh Baptist ministers
People from Pembrokeshire